The 1990–91 Calgary Flames season was the 11th National Hockey League season in Calgary.  The Flames entered the season with a new coach, as they replaced Terry Crisp with Doug Risebrough.  Crisp coached 277 games with the Flames over three years, and his .669 regular season winning percentage remains a Flames record.

The Los Angeles Kings ended the Flames three-year run at the top of the Smythe Division standings, finishing two points ahead of Calgary. The Flames finished 4th overall in the NHL  Calgary's 344 goals led the NHL, the second time the Flames led the league in scoring.  In the playoffs, Calgary met the defending champion Edmonton Oilers in the first round.  Despite finishing 20 points ahead of Edmonton, the Flames fell to the Oilers in seven games.

Four Flames represented the Campbell Conference at the 1991 All-Star Game: forward Theoren Fleury, defencemen Al MacInnis and Gary Suter and goaltender Mike Vernon.  Additionally, MacInnis was named to the first All-Star team for the second season in a row.

Fleury's 51 goals tied him for 2nd in league scoring, behind Brett Hull's 86.  Fleury (104) and MacInnis (103) placed 8th and 9th respectively in league point scoring, with MacInnis leading the league in scoring by a defenceman.  MacInnis also placed 3rd in the league in assists.

In an 8-4 Flames' road win over the St. Louis Blues on March 9, 1991, Theoren Fleury scored three short-handed goals.

Regular season

For the second consecutive season, the Flames led the league in scoring (344 goals for), power-play goals scored (91: tied with the New York Rangers) and power-play percentage, with 23.70% (91 for 384).

Season standings

Schedule and results

Playoffs
The Flames met their arch-rivals, the defending Stanley Cup champion Edmonton Oilers in the first round of the playoffs.  Despite finishing 20 points ahead of Edmonton in the regular season, the Flames fell to the Oilers in seven games.  Calgary's game six victory featured Theoren Fleury's memorable dash down the length of the ice following his overtime winning goal. It was the last time the rivals met in the playoffs, until 2022.

Player statistics

Skaters
Note: GP = Games played; G = Goals; A = Assists; Pts = Points; PIM = Penalty minutes

†Denotes player spent time with another team before joining Calgary.  Stats reflect time with the Flames only.
‡Traded mid-season

Goaltenders
Note: GP = Games played; TOI = Time on ice (minutes); W = Wins; L = Losses; OT = Overtime/shootout losses; GA = Goals against; SO = Shutouts; GAA = Goals against average

Transactions
The Flames were involved in the following transactions during the 1990–91 season.

Trades

Free Agents

Draft picks

Calgary's picks at the 1990 NHL Entry Draft, held in Vancouver, British Columbia.

See also
1990–91 NHL season

References

Player stats: 2006–07 Calgary Flames Media Guide, pg 121
Game log: 2006–07 Calgary Flames Media Guide, pg 138
Team standings:  1990–91 NHL standings @hockeydb.com
Trades: Individual player pages at hockeydb.com

Calgary Flames seasons
Calgary Flames season, 1990-91
Calg